The Schaale is a river of Mecklenburg-Vorpommern, Germany. It is the southern outflow of the Schaalsee. It flows into the Sude near Teldau.

See also
List of rivers of Mecklenburg-Vorpommern

Rivers of Mecklenburg-Western Pomerania
Rivers of Germany